Brooklyn Avenue may refer to:

 List of Brooklyn avenues, 1-28
 List of Brooklyn avenues, A-Z
 Brooklyn Avenue (BMT Fulton Street Line), a former station in New York City
 Cesar Chavez Avenue, a street in Los Angeles formerly named Brooklyn Avenue
 Brooklyn Heights, Los Angeles, California, named for Brooklyn Avenue